This is a list of Michelin starred restaurants in Japan.



List

Tokyo [Kantō region 関東地方]

Kyoto, Ōsaka, Hyōgo (Kobe), Nara [Kansai region 関西地方]

2021

2010 - 2020

Hokkaido region [北海道地方]

Toyama (富山), Kanazawa (金沢) of Ishikawa Prefecture (石川), Niigata (新潟) [Hokuriku region 北陸地方, i.e. northwestern Chūbu region 中部地方]

Aichi (愛知), Gifu (岐阜), Mie (三重) [Tōkai region 東海地方, i.e. southern Chūbu region 中部地方]

Fukuoka (福岡), Saga (佐賀), Nagasaki (長崎), Kumamoto (熊本), Ōita (大分) [Kyushu region 九州地方]

Hiroshima (広島)，Ehime (愛媛)，Tottori (鳥取)，Okayama (岡山) [Chūgoku region 中国地方]

2018 - 2021

See also 
 List of Japanese restaurants
 List of Michelin three starred restaurants
 List of sushi restaurants

References 

Michelin starred restaurants in Japan
Michelin Guide starred restaurants in Japan